Saint-Joseph is a community in Weldford, located 6.63 km ENE of Kent Junction.

History

Saint-Joseph had a Post Office and was called Village-Saint-Joseph from 1923-1927. The community is generally considered a part of the Kent Junction area and is home to Acadian families.

Notable people

See also
List of communities in New Brunswick

References
 

Settlements in New Brunswick
Communities in Kent County, New Brunswick